Talon of the Silver Hawk is  a fantasy novel by American writer Raymond E. Feist, the first book in the Conclave of Shadows trilogy, part of The Riftwar Cycle. It was preceded by Krondor: Tear of the Gods and is followed by King of Foxes.

Plot

Evil has come to a distant land high among the snow-capped mountains of Midkemia, as an exterminating army wearing the colors of the Duke of Olasko razes village after village, slaughtering men, women, and children without mercy.  And when the carnage is done, only one survivor remains: a young boy named Kieli.  A youth no longer, there is now but one road for him to travel: the path of vengeance.  And he will not be alone.  Under the tutelage of the rescuers who discovered him, Kieli will be molded into a sure and pitiless weapon.  And he will accept the destiny that has been chosen for him . . . as Talon of the Silver Hawk.

But the prey he so earnestly stalks is hunting him as well.  And Talon must swear allegiance to a shadowy cause that already binds his mysterious benefactors - or his mission, his honor, and his life will be lost forever.

References 

2002 American novels
2002 fantasy novels
American fantasy novels
Novels by Raymond E. Feist